The 2016–17 Rugby Europe International Championships is the European Championship for tier 2 and tier 3 rugby union nations. The 2016–17 season is the first of its new format and structure, where all Levels play on a one-year cycle, replacing the old format of a two-year cycle, where the teams played each other both home and away.

For all teams competing, except the Development league, this year's edition of the Rugby Europe International Championships doubles as the 2019 Rugby World Cup qualifiers for the European region, where the winner of the Championship, excluding Georgia, automatically qualifies to the tournament as Europe 1. All other teams remains in contention, playing in their respective leagues, but also playing in World Cup play-offs, for the right to play in the Europe/Oceania play-off against Oceania 3.

Countries

Pre-tournament World Rugby rankings (from November 28 for Championship, from August 29 for all other levels) in parentheses

Championship
  (26)
  (12)
  (24)
  (16)
  (19)
  (22)

Conference 1 
North
  (33)
  (51)
  (46)
  (59)
  (58)
South
  (62)
  (54)
  (NA)
  (63)
  (49)

Development
  (96)
  (NA)
  (NA)

Trophy
  (32)
  (34)
  (37)
  (30)
  (31)
  (27)

Conference 2
North
  (88)
  (NA)
  (97)
  (82)
  (90)
South
  (87)
  (74)
  (79)
  (67)
  (NA)

Notes

 Due to financial instability, Turkey has cancelled all matches for the 2016–17 season and is no longer part of World Cup Qualifying.

2017 Rugby Europe Championship

2016–17 Rugby Europe Trophy

2016–17 Rugby Europe Conference

Conference 1

Conference 1 North

Conference 1 South

Conference 2

Conference 2 North

Conference 2 South

2017 Rugby Europe Development

Play-offs

Championship-Trophy Promotion play-off

Conference 1 promotion to Trophy play-off

See also
 2019 Rugby World Cup – Europe qualification

References

 
2017-18
2016–17 in European rugby union
Europe
Europe